Dowlatabad (also Romanized as Dowlatābād; also known as Daulatābād) is a village in Qohab-e Sarsar Rural District, Amirabad District, Damghan County, Semnan Province, Iran. At the 2006 census, its population was 54, in 28 families.

References 

Populated places in Damghan County